Irqah, also romanized as Ergah, is a town in the northwestern fringes of Riyadh in Riyadh Governorate, Saudi Arabia. Nowadays Irqah is considered to be a neighbourhood in Riyadh, and is part of the sub-municipality of its namesake, Baladiyah al-Irqah.

See also
 Najd
 Al-Yamama
 Wadi Hanifa
 Diriyah

References

External links
 Official website
 Irqah Municipality 

Neighbourhoods in Riyadh